Bertram Stevens may refer to:
Bertram Stevens (politician) (1889–1973), Australian politician
Bertram Stevens (critic) (1872–1922), Australian literary critic and editor
Bert L. Stevens (1905–1964), American film and TV actor, brother of Barbara Stanwyck, whose birth name was Malcolm Byron Stevens